Senator Hailey may refer to:

Evelyn Momsen Hailey (1921–2011), Virginia State Senate
O. E. Hailey (1870–1958), Idaho State Senate

See also
Senator Haile (disambiguation)
Senator Haley (disambiguation)